Keith Simmons may refer to:

Keith Simmons (philosopher) (fl. 1980s–2020s), American philosopher 
Keith Simmons (basketball) (born 1985), American professional basketball player

See also
Keith Simons (1954–2017), American football player